Fort Lyon is an unincorporated community and U.S. Post Office in Bent County, Colorado, United States.  The Fort Lyon Post Office has the ZIP Code 81054.

A post office called Fort Lyon was established in 1862. The community was named after Nathaniel Lyon, an officer in the American Civil War.

History
Several Civil War missions occurred at Fort Lyon, including the 1st New Mexico Volunteer Infantry, Reorganized, the 9th Kansas Cavalry Regiment, and the 15th Infantry Regiment.

McLain's Independent Light Artillery Battery was an artillery battery serving in the Union Army.

The Sand Creek massacre also occurred in the community.

Fort Dodge was used to maintain order along the Santa Fe Trail between there and Fort Lyon.

Galvanized Yankees in the 2nd U.S. Volunteer Infantry traveled from Fort Leavenworth, Kansas, to Fort Lyon.

Some German prisoners of war were buried at Fort Lyon and built furniture and worked on local roads.

The ghost town of Sheridan, in Logan County, Kansas, became a railhead for westbound freight to the Santa Fe Trail on a  wagon road to the area.

Geography
Fort Lyon is located at  (38.096741,-103.152008).

Climate
According to the Köppen Climate Classification system, Fort Lyon has a semi-arid climate, abbreviated "BSk" on climate maps.

Notable people
 Eugene Davis, a doctor who managed a Veterans Administration facility in Fort Lyon.
 Farmer Ray, former Major League Baseball player, was born in Fort Lyon.
 Edward W. Wynkoop, a post commander at Fort Lyon.
 Samuel F. Tappan, military officer
 Enoch Steen, United States military officer who commanded at Fort Lyon.
 Josephine Beatrice Bowman, Navy nurse stationed at Fort Lyon
 Walter McCaw, Army surgeon
 William Nathaniel Thomas, Navy chaplain who served at the US Public Service Hospital.
 Kit Carson, a frontiersman who died at the surgeon's quarters in Fort Lyon.
 Laurice Aldridge Tatum, namesake of the USS Tatum, served at Fort Lyon's Naval Hospital.

References

Unincorporated communities in Bent County, Colorado
Unincorporated communities in Colorado